Pseudopecoelus is a genus of trematodes in the family Opecoelidae. It has been synonymised with Neopecoelus Manter, 1947.

Species
Pseudopecoelus ablennesi Bray, 1987
Pseudopecoelus acanthuri Yamaguti, 1970
Pseudopecoelus akamachi Machida & Araki, 2002
Pseudopecoelus alectis Shen, 1990
Pseudopecoelus ariusi Parukhin, 1983
Pseudopecoelus barkeri Hanson, 1950
Pseudopecoelus bilqeesae Ahmad & Dhar, 1987
Pseudopecoelus brayi Madhavi & Triveni Lakshmi, 2010
Pseudopecoelus brevivesiculatus Hanson, 1955
Pseudopecoelus dollfusi Ahmad & Dhar, 1987
Pseudopecoelus elongatus (Yamaguti, 1938) von Wicklen, 1946
Pseudopecoelus epinepheli Wang, 1982
Pseudopecoelus ghanensis Fischthal & Thomas, 1970
Pseudopecoelus gibbonsiae Manter & Van Cleave, 1951
Pseudopecoelus gymnothoracis Nahhas & Cable, 1964
Pseudopecoelus hemilobatus Manter, 1954
Pseudopecoelus holocentri Nahhas & Cable, 1964
Pseudopecoelus japonicus (Yamaguti, 1938) von Wicklen, 1946
Pseudopecoelus littoralis Caballero y Caballero & Caballero Rodríguez, 1976
Pseudopecoelus manteri Sogandares & Hutton, 1958
Pseudopecoelus maomao Yamaguti, 1970
Pseudopecoelus mccauleyi Blend, Dronen, Racz & Gardner, 2017
Pseudopecoelus minutus Nahhas & Cable, 1964
Pseudopecoelus nossamani Kruse, 1977
Pseudopecoelus odeningi Ahmad, 1987
Pseudopecoelus priacanthi (MacCallum, 1921) Manter, 1947
Pseudopecoelus pritchardae Gupta & Sayal, 1979
Pseudopecoelus puhipaka Yamaguti, 1970
Pseudopecoelus pyriformis Prudhoe & Bray, 1973
Pseudopecoelus scorpaenae (Manter, 1947) Overstreet, 1969
Pseudopecoelus sesokoensis Dyer, Williams & Williams, 1988
Pseudopecoelus sewelli Bray, 1990
Pseudopecoelus sosoae Bray & Justine, 2010
Pseudopecoelus sphyraenae Yamaguti, 1970
Pseudopecoelus stunkardi Ahmad, 1990
Pseudopecoelus tortugae von Wicklen, 1946
Pseudopecoelus umbrinae Manter & Van Cleave, 1951
Pseudopecoelus vitellozonatus Pritchard, 1966
Pseudopecoelus vulgaris (Manter, 1934) von Wicklen, 1946

References

Opecoelidae
Plagiorchiida genera